Sanjay Singh (born 22 March 1972) is an Indian politician who has served as a member of the Rajya Sabha from Delhi since 2018. He is the national spokesperson for the Aam Aadmi Party and the state-in-charge for Uttar Pradesh, Odisha and Rajasthan. Singh has been a senior leader of the party since its inception in November 2012 and is a member of the party's foremost decision-making body, the Political Affairs Committee (PAC). He joined hands with Delhi Chief Minister Arvind Kejriwal in his apolitical campaigns from the Right To Information campaign in 2006 to the 2011 Indian anti-corruption movement led by social activist Anna Hazare. He was elected to the Rajya Sabha on 8 January 2018 from the state of Delhi.

Early life and education
He was at the forefront to speak for the right of miners along with being associated to the rights of street hawkers.

Career in social work
He formed the Azad Samaj Seva Samiti in Lucknow in 1994. He worked towards providing employment opportunities to the poor. Singh has time and again been associated with movements related to hawkers and managed to raise their issues at different platforms. He is a part of the National Hawkers' Federation as well.

Prior to joining politics, Sanjay Singh led and was associated with many social movements and causes for people's welfare. He has been a fellow companion of renowned socialist leader Shri Raghu Thakur of the Democratic Socialist Party and participated in various welfare and socialist conferences and movements along with him. Singh was involved in a 16-year struggle for the rights of the street vendors in Uttar Pradesh and proffered his services for disaster relief operations in Gujarat, Uttarakhand, Jammu and Kashmir, Tamil Nadu and Nepal. He later carried on the legacy of Anna Hazare's 2011 Anti-Corruption movement countrywide.

Political career in India 
He accused Punjab revenue minister Bikram Singh Majithia of being complicit with the drug trade and not doing enough to control the menace in Punjab. In turn, Majithia filed a defamation suit against him, Arvind Kejriwal and Ashish Khetan. Later, AAP president Arvind Kejriwal apologised to Majithia for his party's slander against him.
He was also the Delhi state-in-charge for the elections.

In January 2018, he took an oath as a Rajya Sabha MP from Delhi.

Singh has remained active in the Parliament since 2018 and is known for his bold statements against issues in the country. He is a member of the Standing Committee and Consultative Committee on Urban Development, a member of the Silk Board of India and a member of the Parliamentary Friendship Group on Latin American Countries (LAC). He is a former member of the Standing Committee on Coal and Steel. He has participated in several important debates including the Rafale deal for which a 5000 crore defamation suit was filed against him by Anil Ambani group Reliance Defence. Singh also raised discrepancies involving the operational One Stop Centres in the country and the respective fund allocations across the states. Singh has raised concerns related to child deaths due to malnutrition, prevention of child trafficking, stringent punishments for sexual abuse of children amongst others and was felicitated with the PGC Award by UNICEF India in 2020 for his efforts.

During Delhi 2020 elections he was made the campaign in-charge along with Pankaj Gupta who was made the campaign director.
Singh's parliamentary statistics show his exemplary record in the parliament. He has raised 228 starred and un-starred questions in the parliament and introduced 3 Private Member Bills. He has further participated in 142 debates in his tenure of over two years.

In his term as an MP, Singh has provided various works to be carried out in his constituency from his MPLADs fund. In 2018 he donated one crore rupees from MPLAD along with one month of salary towards the Kerala Flood Relief. Some other development activities undertaken by him include the provision of an ambulance in the Rajiv Gandhi Super Speciality Hospital in Delhi, placing street lights and dustbins across Delhi. 

In January 2023 special court in Sultanpur district of Uttar Pradesh sentenced him 3 months of jail term in January 2013 for an old case filed in 2001. He is currently out on bail.

Farm bills

On the passing of the farm bills in the Rajya Sabha during the Monsoon session 2020, Singh showed his strong dissent against the "unconstitutional" passing of the bills and called them "Black Laws" for farmers. Sanjay Singh along with seven other members were suspended from the Rajya Sabha for their "unruly behavior" in the house by tearing documents, breaking mics and allegedly heckling the Deputy Chairman of the Rajya Sabha. The event occurred after the three farmer bills were passed in the Rajya Sabha. He held an overnight peaceful protest the following day in the Rajya Sabha upon his suspension.

He visited and joined the farmers protesting against these bills on Singhu Border.

See also
 Jan Lokpal Bill 2011

References

External links

 Election affidavit for Rajya Sabha

Living people
1972 births
Activists from Uttar Pradesh
Aam Aadmi Party politicians
People from Sultanpur, Uttar Pradesh
21st-century Indian politicians
Rajya Sabha members from Aam Aadmi Party